Brook Warren Berringer (July 9, 1973 – April 18, 1996) was an American quarterback for the University of Nebraska football team in the mid-1990s. Berringer came to Nebraska from Goodland, Kansas, and played a backup role to Tommie Frazier. He was best known for replacing the injured Frazier during the 1994 season and leading the Cornhuskers to seven consecutive wins and to the Orange Bowl national championship game against the University of Miami Hurricanes.

Berringer died in a plane crash just two days before the 1996 NFL Draft.

Early life
Berringer was born in Scottsbluff, Nebraska. When Berringer was seven years old, his father died from cancer. He lived with his mother and two sisters in Goodland, Kansas. Throughout his childhood, he played several different sports.

College career

Freshman and sophomore seasons
Because of his successful high school career, Berringer was recruited by many Big 8 schools, ultimately committing to the University of Nebraska. In his freshman and sophomore seasons, 1992 and 1993 respectively, he appeared in 15 games in a backup role.

Junior season
In 1994, as a junior, he started seven games because starter Tommie Frazier had a blood clot in his leg. Berringer completed 94 of 151 passes (62%) for 1,295 yards, 10 touchdowns and 5 interceptions. Prior to this year, Berringer had completed only 17 passes. The team made it to the Orange Bowl, and Frazier recovered in time to start for it. In the game's first quarter, Frazier threw an interception on Nebraska's second series. Berringer took over, and threw a 19-yard TD pass to Mark Gilman that drew the Huskers within 3 points. Nebraska eventually won the game 24-17 with Berringer playing through the middle quarters before coach Tom Osborne re-inserted Frazier in the fourth quarter.

Senior season
As a senior, Berringer again was a backup. He played sparingly, completing 26 of 51 passes for 252 yards in 9 games played. For the third consecutive year, the Nebraska Cornhuskers played in the national championship game. Berringer played mop-up duty and at the end of the game, the Fiesta Bowl, scored a 1-yard TD for his team's final points. They won a 62-24 victory over Florida.

Plane crash
Despite having spent most of his college career as a backup, Berringer had shown enough promise in the times he did play that he was expected to be selected in the 1996 NFL draft. However, he died in a plane crash just two days before the draft. A private pilot, Berringer was in control of a 1946 Piper Cub over Raymond, Nebraska, when the aircraft went down in an alfalfa field. The National Transportation Safety Board ruled that the probable cause of the crash was a partially closed fuel valve, resulting in fuel starvation, engine failure, and a subsequent loss of control of the airplane. Friend Tobey Lake, the brother of Berringer's girlfriend Tiffini, was also killed in the crash.

A memorial service for Berringer was held on April 20 at Memorial Stadium, before the start of the annual Red-White spring football game. A somber crowd of 48,659 attended. He is interred at Goodland cemetery in Goodland, Kansas.

Epilogue

The country group Sawyer Brown recorded "The Nebraska Song" in tribute to Berringer. (The song was actually written before his death.) The song appears as Track 18 (the same number as Berringer's jersey) on the group's 1997 album Six Days on the Road, and its first live performance was in the Devaney Center on the University of Nebraska campus during the 1997 Nebraska State Fair Sawyer Brown lead vocalist Mark Miller was a pallbearer at Berringer's funeral.

Following Berringer's death, the Nebraska Cornhusker football program established the Brook Berringer Citizenship Team in his honor. Awarded annually before the Spring Game, the Brook Berringer Citizenship Team recognizes Cornhusker football players who have gone above and beyond the call of duty to provide excellent leadership, involvement, and service. A trophy case dedicated to Berringer's memory can be found in the lobby of Goodland High School's Max Jones Fieldhouse.  In 2006, the University of Nebraska erected a life-size bronze statue of Berringer depicted as being coached by Tom Osborne.

See also
 Albert Scott Crossfield
 Jessica Dubroff
 John F. Kennedy, Jr. Piper Saratoga crash
 John T. Walton
 Paul Wellstone

References

External links
 Unbeaten - The Life of Brook Berringer
 

1973 births
1996 deaths
American football quarterbacks
Accidental deaths in Nebraska
Aviators killed in aviation accidents or incidents in the United States
Nebraska Cornhuskers football players
People from Scottsbluff, Nebraska
People from Goodland, Kansas
Victims of aviation accidents or incidents in 1996
Players of American football from Nebraska